Quaristice.Quadrange.ep.ae is a 2008 download-only EP by the electronic music duo Autechre, released by Warp Records. It consists of alternative versions of tracks from the Quaristice album and is classified as an EP by the duo despite being more than two hours in length and being, at the time, the longest release Autechre had ever put out. The EP was released digitally via Bleep.com, one track at a time, between 19 May and 30 May 2008, and is available through various other online music stores as four individual bundles, as seen below.

The EP is accompanied by track-by-track artwork from The Designers Republic.

Track listing

Quaristice.PPP9.ep.ae

Quaristice.9T9P.ep.ae

Quaristice.c9Pn.ep.ae

Quaristice.Subrange.ep.ae

References

External links
 Quaristice.Quadrange.ae.ep announcement and release info at the official Warp Records website.
 Quaristice.Quadrange.ae.ep at Bleep.com

2008 EPs
Autechre EPs
Warp (record label) EPs
Albums with cover art by The Designers Republic